The Coban climbing salamander (Bolitoglossa helmrichi) is a species of salamander in the family Plethodontidae. It is endemic to Guatemala.
Its natural habitats are subtropical or tropical moist montane forests and plantations .
It is threatened by habitat loss.

References

Bolitoglossa
Endemic fauna of Guatemala
Amphibians of Guatemala
Taxonomy articles created by Polbot
Amphibians described in 1836